Glyphipterix ditiorana is a moth in the family Glyphipterigidae first described by Francis Walker in 1863. It is known from Japan, China, Thailand, India, Sri Lanka, Borneo, Java, Malaysia, Mauritius and South Africa.

References

Glyphipterigidae
Moths of Asia
Moths of Africa
Moths described in 1863